Viktor Karlovich Knorre  (4 October 1840 – 25 August 1919) was a Russian astronomer of German ethnic origin. He worked in Nikolaev, Pulkovo and Berlin and is best known for having discovered 158 Koronis and three other minor planets. Knorre's father, Karl Friedrich Knorre, and grandfather, Ernst Friedrich Knorre, were also prominent astronomers. Recently, the main-belt asteroid 14339 Knorre was named in honor of the three generations of Knorre astronomers.

Biography and family background 

Knorre was born into a three-generation astronomer family. His grandfather, Ernst Friedrich Knorre (1759–1810), had moved from Germany to Dorpat (now Tartu, Estonia) where he worked (1803–10) as Observator for the Dorpat observatory (opened in 1802) and professor of Mathematics at the University of Dorpat.
Victor Knorre's father, Karl Friedrich Knorre (1801–1883), set up and was director of the Nikolayev Astronomical Observatory starting in 1827.

Viktor was born the fifth of fifteen children in Nikolayev (now Mykolayiv, Ukraine). He moved to Berlin in 1862 to study astronomy with Wilhelm Julius Foerster. He worked at Pulkovo Observatory in 1867 as an astronomical calculator and then at Berlin Observatory, where his father moved circa 1871.

Astronomer 

From 1873, he was observer at the Berlin Observatory. Knorre discovered four asteroids. He did not teach students at the University of Berlin; instead he gave introductions into the use of the telescopes of the Observatory. In 1892 he was appointed Professor of Astronomy. Knorre took an interest in the improvement of astronomical equipment, and published papers on an improved equatorial telescope mount, referred to as the "Knorre & Heele" mount.

Chess master 

Knorre was also known as a strong chess player, playing among others against Adolf Anderssen, Gustav Neumann and Johannes Zukertort. He took part in several chess tournaments during the 1860s.

In the Two Knights Defense the Knorre variation (ECO code C59) is named after him. It follows the main line of the Two Knights defense for the first ten moves, and is characterized by the moves 10. Ne5 Bd6 11. d4 Qc7 12. Bd2. The Knorre variation of the Open defense in the Ruy Lopez, characterized by the move 6. Nc3, is also named after Knorre.

References

External links 
 M. Ebell: Obituary on Viktor Knorre, in: Astronomische Nachrichten, 1919, volume 209, p. 367 (in German)
 Biographical information on Viktor Knorre
 

1840 births
1919 deaths
Astronomers from the Russian Empire
19th-century German astronomers
Discoverers of asteroids

Russian chess players
Ukrainian chess players
German chess players
Chess theoreticians
19th-century chess players
Academic staff of the Humboldt University of Berlin